Events in the year 1916 in China.

Incumbents
President: Yuan Shikai (until 6 June), Li Yuanhong (from 7 June)
Vice President: Feng Guozhang
Premier: Lou Tseng-Tsiang (until 22 March), Xu Shichang (from 22 March to 23 April), Duan Qirui (from 23 April)

Events
 National Protection War
 22 March – Disestablishment of the Empire of China (1915–16)
 21 September – Establishment of the Vicariate Apostolic of Eastern Honan
 30 October – Vice-presidential election

Deaths
June 6 – Yuan Shikai
November 8 – Cai E

References

 
1910s in China
Years of the 20th century in China